Stara Vas is a formerly independent settlement in the Municipality of Žiri in western Slovenia. It is now part of the town of Žiri. It is part of the traditional region of Upper Carniola and is now included with the rest of the municipality in the Upper Carniola Statistical Region.

Geography
Stara Vas lies along the road from Škofja Loka to Žiri at the point where Račeva Creek discharges into the Poljane Sora River. It is also connected by road to Smrečje. A part of the settlement known as Jezera, which was formerly swampy and subject to frequent flooding, was built up following regulation of Račeva Creek. Goropeke Hill rises to the southeast.

Name
The name Stara vas (literally, 'old village') is relatively common in Slovenia, referring to a settlement that was established earlier than a neighboring one. In the case at hand, compare neighboring Nova Vas pri Žireh (literally, 'new village near Žiri') immediately east of the settlement.

History
Stara Vas was industrialized after the Second World War, with companies such as Alpina Žiri (manufacturing shoes) and Elektro Žiri. Stara Vas was annexed by Žiri in 1981, ending its existence as an independent settlement.

Notable people
Notable people that were born or lived in Stara Vas include the following:
Miha Naglič (sl) (born 1952), essayist and philosopher
Konrad Peternelj (sl) (1936–2000), painter

References

External links

Stara Vas on Geopedia

Populated places in the Municipality of Žiri
Former settlements in Slovenia